William S. Rogers High School is a public high school in Newport, Rhode Island and a part of Newport Public Schools.  Other public high schools include the Paul Crowley MET School and the Career & Technical School.

History
The school was founded by educator William Sanford Rogers in 1873 and was named for him. The original Rogers High School building was on Church Street, the school moved to a building on Broadway in 1905 and the old building became the Thayer School and later a Boys and Girls Club. In 1957, the school moved to its current location on Wickham Road and the old Broadway building became the location for Thompson Middle School. An expansion to the school, The Newport Area Career and Technical Center, was completed in 1968.

Extracurricular
The school's newspaper The Red and Black was first published in 1920, but ceased regular publication in the early 2000s.

The school began their football program in 1890 and their basketball program in 1905.

The school has the second oldest JROTC program in the country, founded in 1916. It also holds the Honor Unit With Distinction rank, the highest unit rank possible.

School song
"Fair Rogers " is sung at every commencement ceremony. Words by Harold B. Walcott, Music by H. S. Hendy.

Alumni

 Edwin T. Banning, architect
 Bebe Buell, singer and model
 William T. Bull, college football coach
 Frank Corridon, Major League Baseball pitcher (1904–1910)
 The Cowsills, 1960s singing act
 Tanya Donelly, co-founder and guitarist of the band Throwing Muses, lead vocalist of the band Belly and the guitarist for The Breeders
 Joanna Going, actress
 Paul Gordon, keyboardist and guitarist with The B-52's and New Radicals
 Kristin Hersh, co-founder, vocalist, and guitarist of the band Throwing Muses
 P. H. Horgan III, PGA Tour player
 John Howard Benson, calligrapher and stone carver
 Van Johnson, actor
 William Stevens Lawton, graduated from Rogers in 1917 and attained the rank of lieutenant general in the United States Army
 Dorothy McCullough Lee, former mayor of Portland, Oregon (1949–1953)
 John Mellekas, professional football player
 Florence K. Murray, former Rhode Island State Senator (1949–1956)
 David Narcizo, drummer for the band Throwing Muses
 M. Teresa Paiva-Weed, former President of the Rhode Island Senate (2009–2017)
 Arthur Rosson, film director
 John P. Vinti, theoretical physicist
 Josephine Silone Yates, the first black student at Rogers High School, she later became the first black woman to head a college science department

References

Schools in Newport County, Rhode Island
Buildings and structures in Newport, Rhode Island
Public high schools in Rhode Island